FlixTrain is a German open-access operator of long-distance railway services. It is a subsidiary of the mobility company Flix SE which also owns long-distance coach operator FlixBus and is supplementing the bus network with rail connections.

The company operates closely with FlixBus, sharing its sales channels, marketing efforts, and network planning resources. During 2018, FlixTrain launched its operations in Germany. In 2019, the company applied for track access in both Sweden and France in anticipation of the upcoming liberalisation of the European railway network during the following year. By mid-2022, FlixTrain had expanded its network in Germany to cover 70 domestic destinations, had also launched services in Sweden, and one line terminating at the Swiss-German border station of Basel Badischer Bahnhof.

History 
FlixTrain launched its operations in 2018. Key early investors in the company have included HV Holtzbrinck Ventures, the European Investment Bank, growth equity firm General Atlantic and technology investor Silver Lake.

During late 2017, a partnership between FlixTrain and another open-access operator, Hamburg-Köln-Express (HKX); roughly six months later, HKX services adopted the FlixTrain branding. Both the HKX and BTE had business links to the American Railroad Development Corporation (RDC), which also worked in partnership with FlixTrain. However, on 20 April 2020, it was announced that RDC and FlixTrain had decided to discontinue their partnership.

During 2017, FlixTrain formed a partnership with the Czech-based open-access operator Leo Express to collaborate on services along the Stuttgart - Berlin route. However, during late 2021, it was announced that this arrangement had been ended due to FlixTrain's temporary suspension as a consequence of the COVID-19 pandemic.

In December 2020, FlixTrain submitted a formal complaint to the European Commission regarding €5 billion in state aid provided by the German government to Deutsche Bahn, alleging improper procedure and the creation of anti-competitive conditions.

Services 

On 23 March 2018, FlixTrain's inaugural service departed Hamburg for Cologne, scheduled services commenced in the following day. On 26 April of that year, in partnership with Leo Express, FlixTrain launched its first service on the Berlin to Stuttgart route.

FlixTrain added seven new destinations to its rail network at the start of a new timetable brought into effect on 15 December 2019. This included a Berlin – Stuttgart service that also called at Leipzig, Halle (Saale), Erfurt, Gotha, Eisenach, and Lutherstadt Wittenberg. Aachen, to the west of Cologne, was also added to the network. A new Hamburg – Stuttgart service was planned for the spring of 2020. During late 2019, FlixTrain announced plans to launch its first service outside Germany via a new service in Sweden, covering both Stockholm – Malmö, and Stockholm – Gothenburg. Originally intended to be launched during the first half of 2020, services in Sweden commenced in partnership with the Stockholm-based rail operator Hector Rail on 6 May 2021.

Under FlixTrain's 2020 timetable, it was operating trains on three long-distance intercity routes, each being served by two trains per day. However, on 20 March 2020, services were suspended temporarily in response to the COVID-19 pandemic. While operations resumed on July 23, the company again suspended all of its services during October 2020 at the start of the pandemic's second wave; it was decided during the suspension to overhaul FlixTrain's rolling stock. In April 2021, FlixTrain announced the restart of operations during the following month, up to four services per day were running on its Berlin - Cologne and Hamburg - Cologne routes from 20 May.

During early 2021, the company decided to expand the number of services that it would operate to include a new Hamburg - Berlin - Leipzig service, launched on 27 May, a Munich - Augsburg - Würzburg- Aschaffenburg - Hanau - Frankfurt route, launched on 18 June, and FlixTrain's first sleeper train between Hamburg - Berlin - Munich, launched on June 17. FlixTrain noted that these new services added 16 cities and towns to its network. This move came in spite of a general downturn in passenger traffic as a consequence of the pandemic, it was speculated that this expansion had been encouraged, at least in part, by the German government’s announced removal of track access fees for 2020 and 2021.

In May 2022, the company announced the addition of three new routes, increasing its network by 12 destinations, expanding to a total of 70 destinations inside Germany; furthermore, service frequency was also increased on the existing Munich - Cologne - Hamburg and Hamburg - Berlin - Leipzig routes. Perhaps the most high profile part of this announcement was the pending launch of Flixtrain’s first cross-border service, running between Berlin and the Swiss city of Basel; operations commenced on 23 June 2022.

Further expansion of FlixTrain's operating area into various other countries has been mooted. During the late 2010s, plans for expanding into the French market were reportedly put into motion, with an anticipated launch date for services during either 2020 or 2021 stated; however, these ambitions were indefinitely postponed in April 2020, the company claimed that this outcome due to the high cost for securing paths in the country in comparison to other European markets.

Rolling stock 
FlixTrain does not usually own the rolling stock that it operates. Instead, the company decided to lease these assets from other companies. Another provider of rolling stock to the company has been Talbot Services, based in Aachen. FlixTrain has reportedly arranged for their trains to be powered exclusively by green electricity.

FlixTrain has primarily opted for rakes of refurbished locomotive-hauled UIC-standard passenger coaches hauled by 3rd generation Siemens EuroSprinter and Siemens Vectron locomotives. During 2020, FlixTrain entered into a co-operative agreement with the European railway leasing company Railpool; according to two companies, all of the leased coaches are equipped with new seats, and have amenities such as modernised restrooms, power sockets at each seat, Wi-Fi technology, and onboard entertainment systems.

During February 2022, the Russian manufacturer Transmashholding (TMH) were reportedly in discussions with FlixTrain for the supply of 65 sets of coaches capable of speeds of up to 230km/h; the proposed deal, valued at €1 billion, was to set to rely upon external financiers to buy the rolling stock and then lease it to FlixTrain. The 2022 Russian invasion of Ukraine however made the proposed deal no longer feasible, and lead the company to investigate alternative options.

References

External links 
 Official website

Rail transport in Germany
Railway services introduced in 2018
High-speed trains of Germany
High-speed trains of Sweden
Passenger trains running at least at 200 km/h in commercial operations
FlixBus